Kolvi Caves or Kholve Caves, are located at Kolvi village in the state of Rajasthan, India. They are carved out in laterite rock hill. This Buddhist site has stupas, chaityas containing figures of Buddha. An architectural style shows dominance of Hinayana sect in this region. The caves has statues of Buddha in the meditation and standing position. The stupas and colossal statues of Buddha are archaeologically significant. Around Kolva village similar caves have been discovered which proves existence of prosperous Buddhist civilization in the region.

The caves
The caves are in state of natural weathering resulting complete damage on northern and eastern side, but their remains are important in the architecture. The group has 50 caves in which many caves have lost their figure faces due to decaying. Currently caves are not occupied. Few caves have open or pillared verandah.

Further reading

See also

References

External links
 Protected monuments by archaeological survey of India in Rajasthan

Buddhist monasteries in India
Buddhist temples in India
Colossal Buddha statues
Buddhist caves in India
Indian rock-cut architecture
Former populated places in India
Buddhist pilgrimage sites in India
Caves containing pictograms in India
Tourist attractions in Jhalawar district
Caves of Rajasthan
Buddhism in Rajasthan